The Italian National Institute of Statistics (Istat) is the primary source of official statistics in Italy. The institute conducts a variety of activities, including the census of population, economic censuses, and numerous social, economic, and environmental surveys and analyses. Istat is the largest producer of statistical information in Italy and is actively involved in the European Statistical System, which is overseen by Eurostat.

History
The Italian National Institute of Statistics (IT ISTAT) was founded in compliance with Law Decree no. 1162 of 9 July, 1926, as the Central Institute of Statistics (IT Istituto Centrale di Statistica) in order to replace the General Statistics Division of the Ministry for Agriculture (now known as Ministero delle politiche agricole alimentari, forestali e del turismo). The direction of the institution, which was subordinated to the head of state, was given to Corrado Gini.

The ISTAT institute, with a staff of about 170 workers, was supposed to update the figures of the censuses that were formerly carried out by the General Statistics Division (that were updated only to 1921), by publishing, as a result, the figures of the 6th general population census. After an acceleration of the duties of the institute in the early 1930s, the national statistics operations were rather slowed down by the economical fines that had been caused by the Ethiopian offensive, that virtually stopped any further publications of the economical-financial figures.

In 1937, the figures that had been already collected, yet, not shared during that period, were eventually published, although the activity of the institute ceased after only two years.

After the outbreak of the Second World War, publications decreased due to the lack of personnel, that had mainly been called up for military service, that led to a consequent postponement of the 9th population census, that would indeed be held in 1951. Furthermore, due to the Cassibile Armistice in 1943, the venue of the institution was moved to the boundaries of the Republic of Salò.

During the late 1940s, the archives were retrieved and moved back to Rome, letting the institute restart completely its activities. With the post-war reconstruction, the ICS mainly focused on collecting new data concerning national development, that eventually allowed for the publication, in 1950, of the volume National Revenue Studies (Studi sul reddito nazionale).

Law Decree no. 322 published on 6 September, 1989, gave life to the National Statistics System (IT Sistema statistico nazionale, Sistan) and changed the name of the institution to the National Institute of Statistics (IT Istituto nazionale di statistica), without changing its acronym, which remained ISTAT.

The publications of the institute are released under creative commons "Attribution" (CC BY) license.

Organization 
The administration of the institute consists of the following:

 President: appointed by the president of Italy upon the proposal of the president of the Council of Ministers (prime minister) after the approval of the Council of Ministers, his term lasts for four years and it can be reappointed only once. He is responsible for the institute performance and its technical and scientific coordination.
 Policy-making and Statistics Information Coordination Committee, whose term lasts for four years, made up of 15 members including the president, carries out steering duties.
 Governing Board, that directs and oversees every activity carried out by the institute. The Governing Board consists of the president of the organization as well as of nine more members.
 Board of Auditors, that makes sure that account final statements thoroughly comply with previous accounting records. Its term lasts for three years and consists of a magistrate of the Council of State who serves as its president, as well as of an executive of the presidency of the council and one from the Ministry of Economy and Finance.

Presidents
Central Institute of Statistics (in Italian, Istituto Centrale di Statistica) (until 1989):
 Alberto Canaletti Gaudenti (1945 - 1949)
 Lanfranco Maroi (1949 - 1961)
 Giuseppe De Meo (1961 - 1980)
 Guido Maria Rey (1980 - 1989)
National Institute of Statistics (in Italian, Istituto Nazionale di Statistica) (since 1989):
 Guido Maria Rey (1989 - 1993)
 Alberto Zuliani (1993 - 2001)
 Luigi Biggeri (2001 - 2009)
 Enrico Giovannini (2009 - 2013)
 Antonio Golini (2013 - 2014)
 Giorgio Alleva (2014 - 2018)
Gian Carlo Blangiardo (2019 - Incumbent)

Access points

Information offices
Istat has 18 regional offices, called Centri di informazione statistica (statistical information centers), which host public access points. The center in Rome also offers data from Eurostat.

Library
The library, established in 1926, is open to the public and contains Istat publications, national and international works on statistical and socioeconomics subjects, and journals from other national statistical institutes and international organizations (Food and Agriculture Organization, International Monetary Fund, OECD, United Nations, etc.). The library collection includes 400,000 volumes and receives about 2800 periodical journals. There are also 1500 volumes printed prior to 1900.

Databases and Information system
Istat provides databases and web interfaces for browsing and downloading of data produced by the institute. The access and downloading of data and information are free and made available on dati.istat.it, seriestoriche.istat.it, and other web interfaces.

References

External links

 Official Website
SISTAN

Italy
Demographics of Italy
Government of Italy
1926 establishments in Italy